Sylvia Li-chun Lin (Shanhua, Tainan, Taiwan) is a Taiwanese-born Chinese–English translator and a former associate professor of Chinese Literature at the University of Colorado Boulder and the University of Notre Dame. She has translated over a dozen novels with her husband Howard Goldblatt.

Awards
Liang Shih-chiu Literary Translation Prize
2000 – National Translation Award for translation of Notes of a Desolate Man by Chu T’ien-wen
2011 – Man Asian Literary Prize for Three Sisters by Bi Feiyu

Works

Translations

Academic

Push Open the Door: Poetry from Contemporary China. Copper Canyon Press 2011. .
 (co-edited with Tze-lan D. Sang)

References

Sources

Living people
Year of birth missing (living people)
Writers from Tainan
Chinese–English translators
Tamkang University alumni
St. John's University (New York City) alumni
University of Oregon alumni
University of California, Berkeley alumni
University of Notre Dame faculty
University of Colorado Boulder faculty
Taiwanese emigrants to the United States
Literary translators
Taiwanese translators
20th-century Taiwanese writers
20th-century Taiwanese women writers
21st-century Taiwanese writers
21st-century Taiwanese women writers